Folke Bohlin is the name of:
 Folke Bohlin (musicologist) (born 1931), Swedish musicologist and choral conductor
 Folke Bohlin (sailor) (1903–1972), Swedish sailor